Seghill RFC is a rugby union team based in Seghill, Northumberland in north-east England. The club currently competes in Durham/Northumberland 3 the ninth tier of the English rugby union system.

History
The rugby club was founded in 1921 due to the boredom during the 1921 coal stoppage, and revulsion from association football.

Seghill currently reside in Durham/Northumberland 3 since relegation from Durham/Northumberland 2 in 1999

Honours 
Northumberland Senior Cup (4): 1925, 1929, 1930, 1932

Notable players
Bill Wallace, one Test match and 6 tour matches for the British & Irish Lions on the 1924 British Lions tour to South Africa.

References

English rugby union teams
RFC